Turks in Japan are Turks living in Japan. Historically, the term has included Turkic (particularly Volga Tatar) émigrés and immigrants from former Russian Empire, most of whom later acquired Turkish citizenship.

History
In the early 20th century, groups of Tatars immigrated from Kazan, Russia, to Japan. The community became led by the Bashkir émigré imam Muhammed-Gabdulkhay Kurbangaliev, who had fought on the side of the White movement in the Russian Civil War and arrived in Japan in 1924; he then set up an organisation to bring together the Tatars living in Tokyo. Tatars in Japan founded their first mosque and school in 1935 in Kobe and another in Tokyo in 1938, with support from Kurbangaliev's organisation. Another Tatar organisation, the Mohammedan Printing Office in Tokyo, printed the first Qur'an in Japan as well as a Tatar language magazine in Arabic script, the Japan Intelligencer; it continued publication until the 1940s. Most of the Tatars emigrated after World War II. Those remaining took up Turkish citizenship in the 1950s.
But there are 600-2,000 Tatars in Japan. They are almost mixed.

Though the Turkish community has diminished in size, those remaining founded the Tokyo Camii and Turkish Cultural Center in 2000. In the following decade, there was a new wave of migration from Turkey, mostly consisting of people from the Fatsa area.

Some Turkish citizens in Japan are ethnic Kurds.

In 2015, a clash took place outside the Turkish embassy in Tokyo between Kurds and Turks, it was claimed that this began when Turks and Kurds got into a quarrel after a Kurdish party flag was shown at the embassy.

Prominent Turks (Volga Tatars) in Japan 
 Osman Yusuf (A.K.A. Johnny Yuseph, 1920 - 1982): Actor
 Abdul Hannan Safa (A.K.A. Roy James, 1929 - 1982): Actor, naturalised in 1971
 Ömer Yusuf (A.K.A. Yusef Toruko ("Yusuf the Turk"), 1930 - 2013): Puroresu referee and actor, brother of Osman Yusuf

Gallery

See also

 Japan–Turkey relations
 Islam in Japan
 Tatars
 Volga Tatars

Footnotes

References

Further reading
 
 

Bashkir diaspora
+
Japan
Japan
Ethnic groups in Japan
Tatar diaspora
Volga Tatar diaspora